Peloppiidae is a family of mites belonging to the order Sarcoptiformes.

Genera:
 Ceratoppiella Hammer, 1977
 Metrioppia Grandjean, 1931
 Paenoppia Woolley & Higgins, 1965

References

Sarcoptiformes